The Digital Platform Workers’ Trade Union (SRDP) is a trade union of internet-based platform workers, including ridesharing and food delivery, in Croatia. It is affiliated with the Union of Autonomous Trade Unions of Croatia.

History
SRDP was founded in June 2021 to fight for better working conditions in a sector with growing importance in Croatia. Two large problems the union announced it would be tackling were the lack of legislation on platform work and the status of "aggregators", medium-sized businesses who organised workers' access to platforms. The union also cited concerns over sick leave, vacations, accident insurance and the partaking in business risk. 

In October, SRDP organised a warning strike of Uber drivers after they were unable to speak to an Uber representative after two weeks without pay.

References

Trade unions established in 2021
Trade unions in Croatia
Tech sector trade unions